The Fire Services Museum is a museum about firefighting in Santo António, Macau, China.

History
The museum building was constructed in 1920. The museum was opened on 11 December 1999.

Architecture
The museum building was built in a European style. It has two exhibition halls with a total area of 350 m2.

Exhibitions
The museum exhibits more than 700 artifacts about fire fighting system, including vehicles and instruments to extinguish fire.

See also
 Fire Services Bureau

References

1999 establishments in Macau
Firefighting museums in China
Macau Peninsula
Museums established in 1999
Museums in Macau